Strongylus may refer to:
 Strongylus (nematode), a genus of nematodes in the family Strongylidae
 Strongylus Herbst, 1792, a genus of beetles in the family Nitidulidae, synonym of Cyllodes
 Strongylus Panzer, 1813, a genus of beetles in the family Coccinellidae, synonym of Coccidula
 Strongylus Mannerheim, 1846, a genus of beetles in the family Lampyridae, synonym of Pyrocoelia